Juan López de Uralde (born 1963) is a Spanish politician co-spokesperson for the Equo political party since 2011. He was spokesperson of Greenpeace Spain from 2001 to 2010 and is deputy in the Spanish Congress for Unidos Podemos since 2015 Spanish general election, being re-elected in the 2016 and 2019 elections.

References

Living people
1963 births
Members of the 12th Congress of Deputies (Spain)
Members of the 13th Congress of Deputies (Spain)
Members of the 14th Congress of Deputies (Spain)
Equo politicians
Members of the 11th Congress of Deputies (Spain)
People associated with Greenpeace
Politicians from San Sebastián